The NCAA Season 94 volleyball tournaments started on November 23, 2018 at the Filoil Flying V Centre in San Juan, Philippines.

All teams will participate in an elimination round which is a single round robin tournament. The top four teams qualify in the semifinals, where the unbeaten team bounces through the finals, with a thrice-to-beat advantage, higher-seeded team possesses the twice-to-beat advantage, or qualify to the first round. The winners qualify to the finals.

Men's tournament

Elimination round

Team standings

|}
Season host is boldfaced.

Point system:
 3 points = win match in 3 or 4 sets
 2 points = win match in 5 sets
 1 point  = lose match in 5 sets
 0 point  = lose match in 3 or 4 sets

Match-up results

Game results

Playoffs

First round
Arellano vs EAC One game playoff.

Semifinals
CSB vs EAC CSB with twice-to-beat advantage.

Finals
Perpetual vs Benilde Best of three series.

 Finals' Most Valuable Player: Joebert Almodiel

Awards
 Most Valuable Player: Joebert Almodiel
 Rookie of the Year: Ruvince Abrot
 1st Best Outside Spiker: Joebert Almodiel
 2nd Best Outside Spiker: Joshua Mina
 1st Best Middle Blocker: Ronniel Rosales
 2nd Best Middle Blocker: Francis Basilan
 Best Opposite Spiker: Jesrael Liberato
 Best Setter: Kevin Magsino
 Best Libero: Joshua Magadan

Women's tournament

Elimination round

Team standings

|}
Season host is boldfaced.

Point system:
 3 points = win match in 3 or 4 sets
 2 points = win match in 5 sets
 1 point  = lose match in 5 sets
 0 point  = lose match in 3 or 4 sets

Match-up results

Game results

Playoffs

Semifinals
Arellano vs San Beda Arellano with twice-to-beat advantage.

CSB vs Perpetual CSB with twice-to-beat advantage.

Finals
Perpetual vs Arellano Best of three series.

 Finals' Most Valuable Player: Regine Arocha

Awards
 Most Valuable Player: Necole Ebuen
 Rookie of the Year: Lynne Robyn Matias
 1st Best Outside Spiker: Cindy Imbo
 2nd Best Outside Spiker: Cesca Racraquin
 1st Best Middle Blocker: Rachel Anne Austero
 2nd Best Middle Blocker: Bien Elaine Juanillo
 Best Opposite Spiker: Necole Ebuen
 Best Setter: Lynne Robyn Matias
 Best Libero: Daryl Racraquin

See also
UAAP Season 81 volleyball tournaments

References

NCAA (Philippines) volleyball tournaments
2018 in Philippine sport
2019 in Philippine sport